Rise is the fourth studio album by American post-hardcore band A Skylit Drive. The album was released on September 24, 2013, through Tragic Hero Records. The first single and title track of the album, "Rise", was released on July 31, 2013. The full track listing was revealed on August 14, 2013. Rise peaked at 41 on the Billboard 200. A lyric video for the track "Unbreakable" was released on September 6, 2013. On February 21, 2014, the music video for the song "Crazy" was released as well. On June 26, 2014, an acoustic performance video for the song "Rise" was released. It's the first album without guitarist Joey Wilson and the last to feature bassist and unclean vocalist, Brian White, and founding drummer and backing vocalist, Cory La Quay, who both left the band in 2014.

Track listing 
All lyrics written by Michael Jagmin and Nick Miller.

On the physical Deluxe Edition of the album, only 3 bonus tracks were included. The only one that never went to the physical release was the demo version of Crazy.

Personnel 

A Skylit Drive
Michael "Jag" Jagmin - clean vocals, backing unclean vocals on tracks 2, 3, 4 and 5
Nick Miller - lead guitar 
Brian White - unclean vocals, Bass, backing clean vocals on track 7 and 8
Cory LaQuay - drums, backing unclean vocals
Kyle Simmons - keyboards, programming, rhythm guitar

Production
Produced by Cameron Mizell
Engineered by Jim Wirt, Kit Waters & Mitchel Marllow, @ Crushtone Studios, Cleveland, Ohio
Management by Joey Simmrin (Rebellion Noise)
Publicity by Jesea Lee
Booking by Ash Avildsen (The Pantheon Agency)
Layout & design by Aaron Marsh
Cover photo by Matt Burke
Model: Alexandra Kees

Charts

References

2013 albums
A Skylit Drive albums
Tragic Hero Records albums
Albums produced by Cameron Mizell